Pawlrang is a village in the Saitual district of Mizoram, India. It is located in the Ngopa R.D. Block. It was established in 1902 by Chinhleia, the youngest son of the Mizo Chief Vanhnuailiana.

Demographics 

According to the 2011 census of India, Pawlrang has 205 households. The effective literacy rate (i.e. the literacy rate of population excluding children aged 6 and below) is 98.76%.

References 

Villages in Ngopa block